Alexander Ivanovich Sokolov (December 1, 1918 – 1973) was a Soviet Russian painter and Art teacher, Honored Artist of the RSFSR, lived and worked in Leningrad, a member of the Leningrad branch of Union of Artists of Russian Federation, regarded as one of the representatives of the Leningrad school of painting, most famous for his genre painting.

Biography 
Alexander Ivanovich Sokolov was born December 1, 1918, in Aleshki village, Voronezh Province of Soviet Russia. He was a veteran of World War II, participated in the defense of the Leningrad and he had many military orders.

In 1950 Alexander Sokolov graduated from Ilya Repin Institute in Victor Oreshnikov workshop. He studied of Veniamin Belkin, Mikhail Bernshtein, Pavel Naumov, Andrei Mylnikov.
 
After graduation, his work was presented in Art Exhibitions. He painted portraits, genre scenes, landscapes, sketches from the life. He was a member of the Leningrad Union of Artists since 1950. Master of Art-criticism (1954), an Honored Artist of the Russian Federation (1970).
 
Alexander Ivanovich Sokolov died on May 9, 1973, in Leningrad. His paintings reside in State Russian Museum, in Art museums and private collections in Russia, France, England, in the U.S., and other countries.

References

Bibliography 
 The Leningrad Fine Arts Exhibition. - Leningrad: Khudozhnik RSFSR, 1965. - p. 51.
 Directory of members of the Leningrad branch of Union of Artists of Russian Federation. - Leningrad: Khudozhnik RSFSR, 1972. - p. 51.
 Matthew C. Bown. Dictionary of 20th Century Russian and Soviet Painters 1900-1980s. - London: Izomar, 1998. , .
 Sergei V. Ivanov. Unknown Socialist Realism. The Leningrad School. - Saint Petersburg: NP-Print Edition, 2007. – pp. 9, 19, 20, 24, 370, 372, 388, 393-395, 397, 399. , .
 Anniversary Directory graduates of Saint Petersburg State Academic Institute of Painting, Sculpture, and Architecture named after Ilya Repin, Russian Academy of Arts. 1915 - 2005. - Saint Petersburg: Pervotsvet Publishing House, 2007.- p. 63.  .

1918 births
1973 deaths
People from Ternovsky District
Soviet painters
Socialist realist artists
Leningrad School artists
Members of the Leningrad Union of Artists
Repin Institute of Arts alumni
Honored Artists of the Russian Federation
Burials at Bogoslovskoe Cemetery
20th-century Russian male artists